Rochester Township is one of the eighteen townships of Lorain County, Ohio, United States. As of the 2010 census the population was 799, of whom 617 lived in the unincorporated portion of the township.

Geography
Located in southwestern Lorain County, it borders the following townships:
Brighton Township - north
Huntington Township - northeast corner
Wellington Township - east
Sullivan Township, Ashland County - southeast corner
Troy Township, Ashland County - south
Ruggles Township, Ashland County - southwest corner
New London Township, Huron County - west
Clarksfield Township, Huron County - northwest corner

The village of Rochester is located in northern Rochester Township.

Name and history
It is the only Rochester Township statewide.

Government
The township is governed by a three-member board of trustees, who are elected in November of odd-numbered years to a four-year term beginning on the following January 1. Two are elected in the year after the presidential election and one is elected in the year before it. There is also an elected township fiscal officer, who serves a four-year term beginning on April 1 of the year after the election, which is held in November of the year before the presidential election. Vacancies in the clerkship or on the board of trustees are filled by the remaining trustees.

References

External links

County website

Townships in Lorain County, Ohio
Townships in Ohio